Chignik is a city in Lake and Peninsula Borough, Alaska, United States. It is two hundred and fifty miles southwest of Kodiak. At the 2020 census the population was 97, up from 91 in 2010.

History
On April 17, 1911, a gale blew ashore numerous ships such as the Benjamin F. Packard, the Star of Alaska, and the Jabez Howes, a three-masted, full-rigged ship owned by the Columbia River Packers Association and used as a cannery tender.

Geography
Chignik is located at  (56.298297, −158.404402).

Demographics

Chignik first appeared on the 1940 U.S. Census as an unincorporated village, although it was preceded by "Chignik Bay", which may have included the village and canneries in the surrounding area, including Chignik Lagoon. Chignik Bay reported a population of 193 in 1890 (which was majority Asian (121), with 66 White residents, 5 Native Alaskans & 1 Other). It did not report again until 1910 when it had a total of 566 residents, which made it the 13th largest community in the territory of Alaska. This was the last time it appeared on the census until Chignik in 1940.

As of the census of 2000, there were 79 people, 29 households, and 20 families residing in the city. The population density was 7 per square mile (3/km). There were 80 housing units at an average density of 7 per square mile (3/km). The racial makeup of the city was 32% white, 61% Native American, 3% Asian, 3% Pacific Islander, 1% from other races, and 1% from two or more races. 1% of the population were Hispanic or Latino of any race.

There were 29 households; 11 had children under the age of 18 living with them, 19 were married couples living together, 2 had a female householder with no husband present, and 8 were non-families. Seven households were individuals, and 10 consisted of a sole occupant 65 years of age or older. The average household size was 2.7 and the average family size was 3.3.

In the city, the age distribution of the population shows 25% under the age of 18, 14% from 18 to 24, 33% from 25 to 44, 23% from 45 to 64, and 5% who were 65 years of age or older. The median age was 36 years. For every 100 females, there were 114 males. For every 100 females age 18 and over, there were 111 males.

The median income for a household in the city was $34,000, and the median income for a family was $51,000. The male and female median incomes were equal, at $31,250. The per capita income for Chignik was $16,000. 5% of the population lived below the poverty line; none were under 18 or over 64 years old.

Notable people
Benny Benson (1913–1972), the famous designer of the Alaskan Flag, was born in Chignik

Climate
The climate present in Chignik is a typical subarctic climate (Köppen climate classification: Dfc), however it is mild when compared to other Alaskan towns with this climate type, for example Fairbanks or Fort Yukon.

References

External links
 2005 Chignik management area annual management report / by Mark A. Stichert.  Hosted by the Alaska State Publications Program.

Cities in Alaska
Cities in Lake and Peninsula Borough, Alaska
Populated coastal places in Alaska on the Pacific Ocean